Tušev Dol is a settlement west of Črnomelj in the White Carniola area of southeastern Slovenia. The area is part of the traditional region of Lower Carniola and is now included in the Southeast Slovenia Statistical Region.

The local church is dedicated to Mary Magdalene and belongs to the Parish of Črnomelj. It was first mentioned in written documents dating to 1526, but was thoroughly rebuilt in the Baroque style in the second half of the 18th century. The main altar dates to 1897.

References

External links
Tušev Dol on Geopedia

Populated places in the Municipality of Črnomelj